Arzan Fud (also Romanized as Arzān Fūd, Arzan Food, and Arzānfūd; also known as Arzāneh Bal, Arzānfūt, and Arzānpūd) is a village in Alvandkuh-e Sharqi Rural District, in the Central District of Hamadan County, Hamadan Province, Iran. At the 2006 census, its population was 2,406, in 645 families.

References 

Populated places in Hamadan County